Saint Thomas More Parish is located in Durham, New Hampshire, United States. Named after Thomas More of England, the Catholic parish was established in 1949 on the corner of Madbury Road and Cowell Drive, near the heart of the campus of the University of New Hampshire.

The parish consists of three buildings. The main building contains the church itself where masses and other services occur. The Church Hall is in the basement of the building and is where many of the Sunday morning Christian Formation classes occur. The food pantry is also located in the Church Hall. Adjacent to the church is the Saint Thomas More Center. The parish offices and campus ministry are in this building. The Saint Thomas More Center houses the beginning of Palm Sunday mass, to allow the laying of palms down upon the path between the center and the church. The third building, the rectory, lies behind the main building. Visitor parking is available near the rectory.

References 

 Untitled photograph of Saint Thomas More Parish, Retrieved November 9, 2010

Churches in the Roman Catholic Diocese of Manchester
Churches in Strafford County, New Hampshire
Buildings and structures in Durham, New Hampshire